Der glorreiche Augenblick, Op. 136 (The glorious moment) is a cantata by Ludwig van Beethoven.

Composition

Der glorreiche Augenblick was written for the opening of the Congress of Vienna after the end of the Napoleonic Wars. While Beethoven had initially supported Napoleon, famously dedicating his Eroica Symphony to him, he rejected him after he declared himself Emperor and scratched the dedication off the title page so violently that he tore the page. The cantata is scored for two sopranos, tenor and bass soloists, chorus and orchestra. Although it was written in 1814 it was not published until 1837, hence the high opus number.

Structure
The work consists of six movements:
Chorus "Europa steht!"
Recitative "O seht sie nah' und näher treten!"
Aria with chorus "O Himmel, welch' Entzücken!"
Recitative "Das Auge schaut"
Recitative and quartet "Der den Bund im Sturme fest gehalten"
Chorus: "Es treten hervor"

Notes

External links
 

Compositions by Ludwig van Beethoven
1814 compositions
Cantatas